The 2019 Central Coast Pro Tennis Open was a professional tennis tournament played on outdoor hard courts. It was the third edition of the tournament which was part of the 2019 ITF Women's World Tennis Tour. It took place in Templeton, California, United States between 23 and 29 September 2019.

Singles main-draw entrants

Seeds

 1 Rankings are as of 16 September 2019.

Other entrants
The following players received wildcards into the singles main draw:
  Klara Kosan
  Ashley Kratzer
  Varvara Lepchenko
  CoCo Vandeweghe

The following players received entry into the singles main draw using protected rankings:
  Victoria Duval
  Irina Falconi

The following players received entry from the qualifying draw:
  Elysia Bolton
  Ellie Douglas
  Sanaz Marand
  Maria Mateas
  Pamela Montez
  Tara Moore
  Anna Morgina
  Sophia Whittle

Champions

Singles

 Shelby Rogers def.  CoCo Vandeweghe, 4–6, 6–2, 6–3

Doubles

 Vladica Babić /  Caitlin Whoriskey def.  Gabriela Talabă /  Marcela Zacarías, 6–4, 6–2

References

External links
 2019 Central Coast Pro Tennis Open at ITFtennis.com
 Official website

2019 ITF Women's World Tennis Tour
2019 in American tennis
September 2019 sports events in the United States
Tennis tournaments in California